Fabián Paz y Miño (born 16 March 1953) is an Ecuadorian footballer. He played in two matches for the Ecuador national football team in 1975. He was also part of Ecuador's squad for the 1975 Copa América tournament.

References

External links
 

1953 births
Living people
Ecuadorian footballers
Ecuador international footballers
Place of birth missing (living people)
Association footballers not categorized by position